Dedric Dukes (born February 4, 1992) is an American sprinter and former American football wide receiver. He attended the University of Florida.

A native of Miami, Dukes attended Booker T. Washington High School, where he ran track and played on the football varsity, being teammates with Quinton Dunbar, Lynden Trail, Eduardo Clements and Elkino Watson.

Dukes finished fourth in the 200 m at the 2009 World Youth Championships in Athletics, despite entering the event as World Youth Leading. He also helped the US medley relay squad to a gold medal.

Dukes ran 200 m in 19.97 on April 4, 2014, at the Florida Relays, a world leading time at that point. The time placed him eighth on the all-time collegiate list.

References

External links

DyeStat profile for Dedric Dukes
Florida Gators bio
Scout.com Recruiting Profile

1992 births
Living people
Track and field athletes from Miami
American football wide receivers
American male sprinters
Florida Gators men's track and field athletes
Players of American football from Miami